Cristoforo di Bindoccio, also called Cristoforo del Maestro Bindoccio or Cristofano Malabarba, (active 1360 - 1409) was an Italian painter active in Siena and Pienza. He worked with Francesco di Vannuccio and Meo di Piero.

References

1300s births
1400s deaths
14th-century Italian painters
Italian male painters
15th-century Italian painters
Painters from Siena